PNL may stand for:

Politics 
 National Liberal Party (Moldova)
 National Liberal Party (Romania)
 National Liberal Party-Brătianu, a defunct Romanian political party known as PNL

Other uses 
 PNL (band), a French rap duo
 Pantelleria Airport (IATA: PNL), in Italy
 Polytechnic of North London, later part of London Metropolitan University
 Perceived Noise Level, see EPNdB
 Personal Assets Trust
 Preferred Network List, list broadcast by WiFi client devices, see KARMA attack

See also
 P&L, the financial term for Profit & Loss, sometimes written PNL
 Profit & Loss, a finance magazine